El Hadji Ousseynou Guèye (born 9 October 1958) is a Senegalese judoka. He competed in the men's half-middleweight event at the 1984 Summer Olympics.

References

External links
 

1958 births
Living people
Senegalese male judoka
Olympic judoka of Senegal
Judoka at the 1984 Summer Olympics
Place of birth missing (living people)